Vinny Claffey is a retired sportsperson from Doon, County Offaly, Ireland.  He played Gaelic football with his home club Doon  and was a member of the Offaly senior inter-county team from 1986 until 2003. He won a Leinster Senior Football Championship medal in 1997 and a National Football League medal in 1998. During Tommy Lyons reign as Offaly manager, Claffey formed part of the full-forward line that included Peter Brady and Roy Malone.

Honours
 Leinster Senior Football Championship (1) 1997
 National Football League Division 1 1998
 O'Byrne Cup 1993 1997 1998
 Leinster Under-21 Football Championship (2) 1986 1988
 All-Ireland Under-21 Football Championship (1) 1988

References

Year of birth missing (living people)
Living people
Doon Gaelic footballers
Gaelic football forwards
Irish farmers
Offaly inter-county Gaelic footballers